The Laurel Hill Plantation in Adams County, Mississippi, about  south of Natchez, Mississippi, is a historic Southern plantation.  It was nominated for listing on the National Register of Historic Places, and was listed in 1982.  The main house of the plantation no longer exists.  The listing includes a historic brick church named St. Mary's Chapel and a building from 1835 to 1840 which was a parsonage for the church, or was an outbuilding to the parsonage, and other outbuildings.

It has been listed on the National Register since October 26, 1982.

References

Churches on the National Register of Historic Places in Mississippi
Churches in Adams County, Mississippi
Plantations in Mississippi
National Register of Historic Places in Adams County, Mississippi